Dadalla  is one of fifteen wards (Ward No. 12) that comprise the city of Galle, Sri Lanka.

It is made up of five Grama Niladharis: Gintota West; Gintota East; Dadella West; Dadella East and Walawwatte/Siyambalagahawatte.

It contains the Dadalla cemetery

See also
 Galle
 List of towns in Southern Province, Sri Lanka

External links

Populated places in Southern Province, Sri Lanka